Laura Chenoweth Butz (July 11, 1860 – September 1, 1939) was an American educator. She was the Superintendent of Wardner-Kellogg City Schools for eight years.

Early life
Laura Ann Chenoweth Butz was born in Danville, Illinois, on July 11, 1860, the daughter of Thomas N. Chenoweth (died 1903).

Career
Laura Chenoweth Butz was assistant to State Superintendent Research Secretary.

She was connected with Wardner-Kellogg from 1900 to 1923, and for eight years served as Superintendent of Wardner-Kellogg City Schools.

She was very active in educational work of the state, well-known as lecturer in Parent–Teacher Association work.

She was a member of the Women's Federated Club and P.E.O. Sisterhood.

Personal life
Laura Chenoweth Butz lived in Kansas and moved to Idaho in 1899. In 1879 she married Robert Allen Butz (1851–1923) and had four children: C. W. Butz, J. C. Butz, Harry L. Butz, Mrs. D. M. Rees.

In the 1900 United States census, she lived at Wardner 1-2, Osburn, Shoshone, Idaho.

She died on September 1, 1939, and is buried at Forest Cemetery, Coeur d'Alene, Idaho.

References

1860 births
1939 deaths
People from Danville, Illinois
Educators from Illinois
American women educators